Linda Church (born June 12, 1960) is a former morning weather anchor for the WPIX (New York) PIX11, formerly WB11 & CW11, Morning News since its debut in June 2000 until her retirement in January 2017.

Church is a former WPIX weekend weather anchor from 1990 to 1996. From 1987 to 1990 Church worked for WNBC (New York). Church served as the noon weather anchor at WCBS (New York). Church also co-hosted the show "Summer Fun for Kids" with former WPIX colleague Mat Garcia in June 2003 and with Craig Treadway in July 2007.

Early career
Church began her career in Gainesville, Florida, and went on to work for stations in Cleveland, New Haven, and Charleston.

Retirement
On January 20, 2017, Church announced her retirement from the station.

Awards
 National Academy of Television Arts & Sciences (Emmy Awards)
 Best Morning News Show (WB11 Morning News) - 2000, 2004

Background
Church attended the University of Florida
as an undergraduate and the University of New Haven for graduate studies. She has a seal from the American Meteorological Society.

References

External links
Church's bio at CW11
Church's Facebook Page

American reporters and correspondents
American television journalists
American women television journalists
Living people
New York (state) television reporters
Television anchors from New York City
University of Florida alumni
University of New Haven alumni
Place of birth missing (living people)
1960 births
21st-century American women